Puerto Rico Highway 525 (PR-525) is a rural road located entirely in the municipality of Adjuntas, Puerto Rico.

Major intersections

Related route

Puerto Rico Highway 5525 (PR-5525) is a north–south road that branches off from PR-525 in Limaní barrio.

See also

 List of highways numbered 525

References

525
Adjuntas, Puerto Rico